Roberto Durán Arena, originally known as Gimnasio Nuevo Panama, is an indoor sporting arena located in Panama City, Panama.  The capacity of the arena is 8,417 spectators and opened in 1970. It hosts indoor sporting events such as basketball, boxing and volleyball.  It hosts the Panama men's national basketball team.  It is named after Panamanian boxer Roberto Durán.

The finals of the national top basketball league Liga Profesional de Baloncesto (LPB) are played in the arena each year.

References

Indoor arenas in Panama
Sports venues in Panama City
Basketball venues in Panama
Volleyball venues in Panama